Mark Romano Birighitti (born 17 April 1991) is an Australian professional footballer who plays as a goalkeeper for Scottish Premiership side Dundee United.

Born in Perth, Birighitti played youth football at the Australian Institute of Sport before making his professional debut for Adelaide United. In 2012, he moved to Newcastle Jets and spent time on loan to Italian club Varese in 2015. In 2016, Birighitti left Newcastle to again move to Europe, firstly with Swansea City and then NAC Breda. He returned to the A-League in 2018 with Melbourne City before moving to Central Coast Mariners a year later. He then signed for Dundee United in 2022.

Birighitti has played once for the Australian national team, at the 2013 EAFF East Asian Cup. He has also represented Australia's youth teams on many occasions, including at the 2011 FIFA U-20 World Cup and winning the 2010 AFF U-19 Youth Championship.

Club career

Adelaide United
Birighitti started his career at the AIS before moving to Adelaide United in 2008. He made his first team debut against Queensland Roar on 17 October 2008 helping Adelaide to a 1–0 win. Aurelio Vidmar praised the young goalkeeper after the match saying "I think Birighitti played well he's got a really good future, he had big shoes to fill and I think he did an outstanding job tonight."

His second successive A-League start came against Perth Glory at Hindmarsh Stadium after Adelaide's number one goalkeeper, 28-year-old Eugene Galekovic, was injured during the Asian Champions League match against FC Bunyodkor. Despite conceding the match's first goal at the near post, Birighitti played his part in the 2–1 win taking Adelaide to the top of the league table.

With Galekovic again ruled out with injury Birighitti started the second leg of the 2008 AFC Champions League Final against Gamba Osaka on 12 November 2008; Adelaide lost the match 2–0. He injured his ankle after falling awkwardly in a training session on 17 December 2008 ruling him out of the remaining A-League 2008-09 season.

Newcastle Jets
On 17 January 2012 it was announced he had signed a two-year contract with A-League club Newcastle Jets starting post the 2012 AFC Champions League group stage.
He quickly became the first choice goalkeeper for the Newcastle Jets, edging out Ben Kennedy and Jack Duncan. In late 2013 he signed a contract extension with the Jets until the end of the 2015–16 season.

On 24 March 2014, Birighitti flew to Germany to discuss a possible transfer to Bundesliga club Bayer Leverkusen. After failing to secure a contract with Bayer Leverkusen he then came back to the Jets for the 2014–15 season.

In October 2015, Birighitti was involved in an on-field collision with Sydney FC striker Shane Smeltz. Birightitti suffered multiple broken teeth and required facial surgery after the incident. He returned to action within weeks, missing only one A-League game.

Loan to Varese
On 27 January 2015, Birighitti joined Serie B club Varese on a six-month loan deal. He made his league debut for Varese in a 1–0 away loss to Vicenza on 25 April 2015.

Swansea City
On 18 July 2016, Birighitti joined Premier League side Swansea City on a two-year deal. After the 2016–17 season, Birighitti went on trial at Dutch side Willem II, following a lack of opportunities at Swansea.

NAC Breda
On 1 September 2017, Birighitti joined Eredivisie side NAC Breda on a two-year deal.

Melbourne City
On 11 September 2018, Birighitti joined Australian A-League side Melbourne City on a three-year deal. He again found himself as second-choice goalkeeper behind Eugene Galekovic - the same situation to his time at Adelaide United. After a year in which he didn't play at all, Birighitti negotiated a mutual release from the remainder of his contract.

Central Coast Mariners
In August 2019, Birighitti joined Central Coast Mariners on a one-year contract.

Dundee United
On 21 July 2022, it was announced that Birighitti had signed a two-year contract with Dundee United, subject to international clearance. He made his first competitive start for his new club in their opening Scottish Premiership match against Kilmarnock which resulted in a 1–1 draw. Birighitti made his European debut in a 1–0 win against AZ Alkmaar, however, the second leg of the tie ended in a 7–0 Dundee United loss, knocking them out the competition.

International career
Birighitti was selected to represent the Australian under-20 squad at the 2010 AFC U-19 Championship.

He made his debut for the senior Australian side in their final match of the 2013 EAFF East Asian Cup against China, a 4–3 loss.

Career statistics

Honours
Australia U20
 AFF U-19 Youth Championship: 2010

Individual
 A-League All Star: 2014
 PFA A-League Team of the Season: 2015–16, 2020–21, 2021–22
 A-League Goalkeeper of the Year: 2020–21, 2021–22

References

External links
 
 
 
 

1991 births
Living people
Soccer players from Perth, Western Australia
Australian people of Italian descent
Australian soccer players
Association football goalkeepers
Australian Institute of Sport soccer players
Newcastle Jets FC players
Adelaide United FC players
S.S.D. Varese Calcio players
Swansea City A.F.C. players
NAC Breda players
Melbourne City FC players
Central Coast Mariners FC players
Dundee United F.C. players
Victorian Premier League players
A-League Men players
Serie B players
Australia youth international soccer players
Australia under-20 international soccer players
Australia international soccer players
Australian expatriate soccer players
Australian expatriate sportspeople in Italy
Australian expatriate sportspeople in Wales
Australian expatriate sportspeople in Scotland
Expatriate footballers in Italy
Expatriate footballers in Wales
Expatriate footballers in Scotland
Scottish Professional Football League players